Kuriakose is a common male first name and surname among Saint Thomas Christians, mainly from central part of the state of Kerala in India and surrounding areas. Derivatives of the name Kuriakose include "Kurian" and "Kurien". This name is a variant of names found among Middle Eastern countries among the minority Syrian, Iranian and Iraqi Christians such as Assyrians and Arabs, 'Kuriakos'  in Greece and 'Cyriacus in Italy and 'Cyr' in France.

The name Kuriakose is derived from the Syriac Aramaic name ܩܘܪܝܩܘܣ (quryāqōs) which itself is from Greek. The name is believed to have originated from Saint Quriaqos who is known in both Syriac and Latin liturgies
The meaning of "Kuriakose" most closely matches to "Lordian" or "Deriving from the Lord".

Various forms of Kuriakose

Notable people with name Kuriakose and its derivatives
Arackaparambil Kurien Antony, former Defense Minister of India
Benny Kuriakose, conservation consultant
Eden Kuriakose, Indian actress
Kuriakose Elias Chavara, founder of Carmelites of Mary Immaculate and a Catholic Saint 
T K Kurien, CEO and Executive Director of Wipro Limited
Thomas Kurian, CEO of Google Cloud and Former President of Oracle Corporation
Verghese Kurien, founder of the Gujarat Co-operative Milk Marketing Federation
Pius C. Kuriakose, former Chief Justice of Sikkim High Court
Jomon Kuriakose, chef in UK

See also
Saint Thomas Christians
Syrian Christians
Assyrians in Iran
Assyrians in Iraq

Notes

Masculine given names
Saint Thomas Christians